The 1993 Furman Paladins football team was an American football team that represented Furman University as a member of the Southern Conference (SoCon) during the 1993 NCAA Division I-AA football season. In their eighth year under head coach Jimmy Satterfield, the Paladins compiled an overall record of 5–5–1 with a mark of 4–4 in conference play, finishing tied for fourth in the SoCon.

Schedule

References

Furman
Furman Paladins football seasons
Furman Paladins football